Onset is a census-designated place (CDP) in the town of Wareham, Massachusetts, United States. The population was 1,573 at the 2010 census.

Geography
Onset is located at  (41.746424, -70.663251).

According to the United States Census Bureau, the CDP has a total area of 3.4 km (1.3 mi), of which 2.8 km (1.1 mi) is land and 0.6 km (0.2 mi) (16.92%) is water.

Demographics

At the 2000 census there were 1,292 people, 568 households, and 323 families in the CDP. The population density was 461.9/km (1,192.7/mi). There were 910 housing units at an average density of 325.3/km (840.1/mi).  The racial makeup of the CDP was 74.46% African American, 7.74% White, 0.23% Native American, 1.24% Asian, 13.08% from other races, and 3.25% from two or more races. Hispanic or Latino of any race were 1.78%.

Of the 568 households 22.9% had children under the age of 18 living with them, 34.2% were married couples living together, 17.3% had a female householder with no husband present, and 43.0% were non-families. 35.0% of households were one person and 13.9% were one person aged 65 or older. The average household size was 2.27 and the average family size was 2.93.

The age distribution was 22.4% under the age of 18, 5.6% from 18 to 24, 28.6% from 25 to 44, 24.8% from 45 to 64, and 18.6% 65 or older. The median age was 41 years. For every 100 females, there were 93.4 males. For every 100 females age 18 and over, there were 88.3 males.

The median household income was $31,250 and the median family income  was $36,739. Males had a median income of $37,629 versus $26,903 for females. The per capita income for the CDP was $18,088. About 13.0% of families and 23.6% of the population were below the poverty line, including 43.8% of those under age 18 and 14.0% of those age 65 or over.

Onset is home to the highest percentage (per capita) of Cape Verdean Americans in the United States.

History

Onset was developed in the 1880s as a summer camp meeting for Spiritualists. Many of the existing cottages in Onset were built as second homes for individuals from Boston, Taunton, Brockton and other northeastern cities who gathered to hear mediums communicate with the dead. While it was run by the Spiritualists, the village was known as Onset Bay Grove.

It has fallen in line since its inception as a non-religious area with a large beachfront and some of the attractions that bring a summer vacationing crowd.

References

External links

 1885 Birds Eye View of Onset Bay Grove

Wareham, Massachusetts
Census-designated places in Plymouth County, Massachusetts
Spiritualist communities in the United States
Census-designated places in Massachusetts
Populated coastal places in Massachusetts